The women's team foil was one of eight fencing events on the fencing at the 1968 Summer Olympics programme. It was the third appearance of the event. The competition was held from 23 to 24 October 1968. 52 fencers from 10 nations competed.

Rosters

Results

Round 1

Pool A

Pool B

Pool C

Elimination rounds

Final ranking

References

Foil team
1968 in women's fencing
Fen